Saintsbury is a surname. Notable people with the surname include:

 George Saintsbury (1845–1933), English writer, literary historian, scholar, critic, and wine connoisseur
 Harry Arthur Saintsbury, or H. A. Saintsbury (1869–1939), English actor and playwright

See also
 Sainsbury (disambiguation)